Niani may refer to: 

 Niani District, a district of the Central River Division of the Gambia
 Niani, Guinea, a village in Guinea
 Niani, an alternative name of the Mali Empire